The Sixty-Four Counties Youth Movement (HVIM) is a far-right movement originating in Hungary and also present in Romania, Slovakia and Serbia, advocating the unification of all ethnic Hungarians that live outside of Hungary and the revision of the Treaty of Trianon from 1920, which defined the current borders of the Hungarian state. Until 2013 the leader of the 64 Counties Youth Movement was László Toroczkai.

It is named in memory of Greater Hungary, which was divided into 64 counties, although it is an anachronism, because the Kingdom of Hungary had only 63 counties, but the city of Fiume and its district as a corpus separatum was under Hungarian rule and it was meant as the 64th county by the founders for simplicity.

The Sixty-Four Counties Youth Movement has engaged on violent assaults on civilians in Serbia.

Ties to other organisations 
The HVIM is responsible for organising the yearly Magyar Sziget festival. The youth movement has ties to the Betyársereg ('Army of Outlaws'), a black-clad 'self-defense force' that has a motor club as well. This group is also present at the HVIM youth camps, teaching kids survival skills as well as Hungarian history.

Charges on attempted terrorist act
On 1 December 2015, István Beke, a member of the organization, was arrested by the Romanian authorities for planning to detonate an improvised explosive device in Târgu Secuiesc during the Great Union Day parade. Beke was charged with "attempted actions against constitutional order and failure to observe the rules governing the explosive materials regarding the prevention and combat of terrorism".

Zoltán Szőcs, the leader of HVIM's Transylvanian chapter, was also detained. According to the Romanian prosecutor's office, Szőcs had incited Beke and other activists to produce home-made bombs, which would be detonated during the national holiday.

On 1 February 2016, the arrest warrants of the two HVIM members were extended by 30 more days.

On 7 April 2017, Beke and Szőcs were sentenced to 11 months and 10 months imprisonment, respectively. On 4 July 2018, Beke and Szőcs were handed a final sentence of 5 years imprisonment each.

Violence in Serbia  
In September 2011, group of 15 Hungarian members of the "Sixty-Four Counties" movement assaulted 5 Serbian men with metal rods who were going back from their friend's birthday party  in Temerin. According to the statement of a victim's mother, the attackers were dressed in uniformed Blackshirts and attacked the young men because they were speaking Serbian. As the mother stated, "these children had to be beaten because they are  Serbs and because they speak Serbian in Serbia".

See also
 Our Homeland Movement, Party of László Toroczkai.

References

External links
Official site
French Section site
Hungarian far-right figure attacked in Serbia

Hungarian nationalism
Hungarian irredentism
Terrorism in Romania